Events in the year 1874 in Norway.

Incumbents
Monarch: Oscar II

Events

Arts and literature

Births
12 April – Kristian Edland, farmer and politician.
8 May – Endre Johannes Cleven, settler in Canada (died 1916)
2 July – Oluf Wesmann-Kjær, rifle shooter (died 1945)
14 July – Torleiv Hannaas, philologist (died 1929)
24 August – Einar Hanssen, judge.
3 September – Carl Størmer, mathematician and physicist (died 1957)
8 September – Torgrim Castberg, violinist (died 1928)
26 September – Simon Johnson, Norwegian-American author (died 1970)
2 December – Johannes Hanssen, bandmaster, composer and teacher (died 1967)
19 December – Axel Theodor Næss, judge (d. 1945).

Full date unknown
Aagot Didriksen, actress (died 1968)
Knut Olai Thornæs, newspaper editor and politician (died 1935)

Deaths
20 February – Dominicus Nagell Lemvig Brun, military officer and politician (b.1790)
1 March – Hans Jørgen Darre, clergyman (b.1803)
15 September – Christian Schou, brewer and merchant (born 1792).
6 October – Thomas Tellefsen, pianist and composer (b.1823)

Full date unknown
Jens Lauritz Arup, politician (b.1793)
Ole Ingebrigtsen Soelberg, politician (b.1798)
Carl Johan Severin Steen, politician (b.1825)

See also

References